Albert Pike (December 29, 1809April 2, 1891) was an American author, poet, orator, editor, lawyer, jurist and Confederate general who served as an associate justice of the Arkansas Supreme Court in exile from 1864 to 1865. He had previously served as a senior officer of the Confederate States Army, commanding the District of Indian Territory in the Trans-Mississippi Theater. A prominent member of the Freemasons, Pike served as the Sovereign Grand Commander of the Supreme Council, Scottish Rite (Southern Jurisdiction, USA) from 1859 to 1891.

Early life and education
Albert Pike was born in Boston, Massachusetts, on December 29, 1809, the son of Benjamin and Sarah (Andrews) Pike, and spent his childhood in Byfield and Newburyport, Massachusetts. His colonial ancestors settled the area in 1635, and included John Pike (1613–1688/1689), the founder of Woodbridge, New Jersey. He attended school in Newburyport and Framingham until he was 15. In August 1825, he passed entrance exams at Harvard University, though when the college requested payment of tuition fees for the first two years, he chose not to attend. He began a program of self-education, later becoming a schoolteacher in Gloucester, North Bedford, Fairhaven and Newburyport.

In 1831, he left Massachusetts to travel west, first stopping in Nashville, Tennessee, and later moving to St. Louis, Missouri.

There he joined a hunting and trading expedition to Taos, New Mexico. En route his horse broke and ran, forcing Pike to walk the remaining  to Taos. After this, he joined a trapping expedition to the Llano Estacado in New Mexico and Texas.

Career

Settling in Arkansas in 1833, Pike taught in a school and wrote a series of articles for the Little Rock Arkansas Advocate under the pen name of "Casca." The articles were sufficiently well received for him to be asked to join the newspaper's staff. Under Pike's administration, the Advocate promoted the viewpoint of the Whig Party in a politically volatile and divided Arkansas in December 1832. After marrying Mary Ann Hamilton in 1834, he purchased the newspaper.

He was the first reporter for the Arkansas Supreme Court. He wrote a book (published anonymously), titled The Arkansas Form Book, which was a guidebook for lawyers. Pike began to study law and was admitted to the bar in 1837, selling the Advocate the same year. (At least one source indicates that Pike read Kent and Blackstone and was admitted to the bar in 1834 by Superior Court judge Thomas J. Lacy, after a perfunctory examination.) He proved to be a highly effective lawyer, representing clients in courts at every level, which continued after he received permission to practice before the United States Supreme Court in 1849.

He also made several contacts among the Native American tribes in the area. He specialized in claims on behalf of Native Americans against the federal government. In 1852, he represented the Creek Nation before the Supreme Court in a claim regarding ceded tribal land. In 1854 he advocated for the Choctaw and Chickasaw, although compensation later awarded to the tribes in 1856 and 1857 was insufficient. These relationships were to influence the course of his Civil War service.

He also began a campaign of newspaper essays urging support for the construction of a transcontinental railroad extending from New Orleans to the Pacific coast, moving to New Orleans in 1853 and preparing to pass the state bar in furtherance of his campaign, and was ultimately able to secure a charter from the Louisiana State Legislature for a project, following which he returned to Little Rock in 1857.

He joined the anti-Catholic Know Nothing Party at its founding, and, in the summer of 1854, helped introduce the party in Arkansas.  He attended the national convention in 1856, but walked out when it failed to adopt a pro-slavery platform.  In the lead-up to the Civil War, Pike signed a pamphlet which proposed expelling all free African Americans from Arkansas. It said that the "evil is the existence among us of a class of free colored persons".

Additionally, Pike wrote on several legal subjects. He also continued writing poetry, a hobby he had begun in his youth in Massachusetts. His poems were highly regarded in his day, but are now mostly forgotten. Several volumes of his works were privately published posthumously by his daughter.  In 1859, he received an honorary Master of Arts degree from Harvard.

Poetry
As a young man of letters, Pike wrote poetry, and he continued to do so for the rest of his life. At 23, he published his first poem, "Hymns to the Gods." Later work was printed in literary journals such as Blackwood's Edinburgh Magazine and local newspapers. His first collection of poetry, Prose Sketches and Poems Written in the Western Country, was published in 1834. He later gathered many of his poems and republished them in Hymns to the Gods and Other Poems (1872). After his death these were published again in Gen. Albert Pike's Poems (1900) and Lyrics and Love Songs (1916).

The authorship of "The Old Canoe" was attributed to Pike. He was suggested as author because about the time of its publication, when it was going the rounds of the press, probably without any credit, a doggerel called "The Old Canoe" was composed about Pike by one of his political foes. The subject was a canoe in which he left Columbia, Tennessee, when a young man practicing law in that place. Pike told Senator Edward W. Carmack that he was not the author of "The Old Canoe," and could not imagine how he ever got the credit for it. The rightful author was Emily Rebecca Page.

Freemasonry

Pike first joined the fraternal Independent Order of Odd Fellows in 1840. He next joined a Masonic Lodge, where he became extremely active in the affairs of the organization. In 1859 he was elected Sovereign Grand Commander of the Scottish Rite's Southern Jurisdiction. He remained Sovereign Grand Commander for the rest of his life, devoting a large amount of his time to developing the rituals of the order.

In 1865, he publicly performed a ceremony of Masonic baptism in New York City.

He published a book called Morals and Dogma of the Ancient and Accepted Scottish Rite of Freemasonry in 1871, the first of several editions. This helped the Order grow during the nineteenth century. He also researched and wrote the seminal treatise Indo-Aryan Deities and Worship as Contained in the Rig-Veda. In the United States, Pike is still considered an eminent and influential Freemason, primarily in the Scottish Rite Southern Jurisdiction.

Military service

Mexican–American War
When the Mexican–American War started, Pike joined the Arkansas Mounted Infantry Regiment and was commissioned as a company commander with the rank of captain in June 1846.  With his regiment, he fought in the Battle of Buena Vista. Pike was discharged in June 1847.  He and his commander, Colonel John Selden Roane, had several differences of opinion. This situation led finally to an "inconclusive" duel between Pike and Roane on July 29, 1847, near Fort Smith, Arkansas. Although several shots were fired in the duel, nobody was injured, and the two were persuaded by their seconds to discontinue it.

After the war, Pike returned to the practice of law, moving to New Orleans for a time beginning in 1853. He wrote another book, Maxims of the Roman Law and Some of the Ancient French Law, as Expounded and Applied in Doctrine and Jurisprudence. Although unpublished, this book increased his reputation among his associates in law. He returned to Arkansas in 1857, gaining some amount of prominence in the legal field.

At the Southern Commercial Convention of 1854, Pike said the South should remain in the Union and seek equality with the North, but if the South "were forced into an inferior status, she would be better out of the Union than in it."  His stand was that state's rights superseded national law and he supported the idea of a Southern secession. This stand is made clear in his pamphlet of 1861, "State or Province, Bond or Free?"

American Civil War
In 1861, Pike penned the lyrics to "Dixie to Arms!" At the beginning of the war, Pike was appointed as Confederate envoy to Native American nations. In this capacity he negotiated several treaties, one of the most important being with Cherokee chief John Ross, which was concluded in 1861. At the time, Ross agreed to support the Confederacy, which promised the tribes a Native American state if it won the war. Ross later changed his mind and left Indian Territory, but the succeeding Cherokee government maintained the alliance.

Pike was commissioned as a brigadier general in the Confederate States Army on November 22, 1861, and given a command in the Indian Territory. With Brig. Gen. Ben McCulloch, Pike trained three Confederate regiments of Indian cavalry, most of whom belonged to the "civilized tribes", whose loyalty to the Confederacy was variable. Although initially victorious at the Battle of Pea Ridge (Elkhorn Tavern) in March 1862, Pike's unit was defeated later in a counterattack, after falling into disarray. When Pike was ordered in May 1862 to send troops to Arkansas, he resigned in protest. As in the previous war, Pike came into conflict with his superior officers, at one time drafting a letter to Jefferson Davis complaining about his direct superior.

After Pea Ridge, it was alleged that Pike's Native American troops had scalped soldiers in the field. The single incident of scalping was, however, done by a Native America acting on his own. Official records submitted to the Headquarters Department of Indian territory reveal that Pike "regarded [the incident] with horror" and that he was personally "angry and disgusted." He also filed a report in which he said it caused him the "utmost pain and regret."

Maj. Gen. Thomas C. Hindman charged Pike with mishandling of money and material, ordering his arrest. The incident arose when Hindman, who had declared martial law in Arkansas, ordered Pike to turn over weapons and Native American Indian treaty funds. Pike thought the action was illegal and refused. Both these charges were later found to be considerably lacking in evidence; nevertheless Pike, facing arrest, escaped into the hills of Arkansas, submitting his resignation from the Confederate States Army on July 12, 1862. He was arrested on November 3 on charges of insubordination and treason, and held briefly in Warren, Texas. His resignation was accepted on November 11, and he was allowed to return to Arkansas.

As Union troops advanced toward the state capital in September 1863, the State Supreme Court retreated to Washington, Arkansas, which was made the new Confederate state capital. Associate Justice Hulbert F. Fairchild resigned because the new location was too far from his family, and Pike was appointed as his replacement.

In the wake of the war, Pike moved to New York City, then for a short time to Canada. On June 24, 1865, Pike applied to President Andrew Johnson for a pardon, disowning his earlier interpretation of the U.S. Constitution. He said he now planned "to pursue the arts of peace, to practice my profession, to live among my books, and to labour to benefit my fellows and my race by other than political courses". President Johnson pardoned him on April 23, 1866.

Later life
During the Arkansas political conflict known as the Brooks-Baxter War, Pike was one of the lawyers to speak on behalf of Elisha Baxter.

Death and legacy

Pike died on April 2, 1891, in at the Scottish Rite Temple of the Supreme Council in Washington DC, at the age of 81, and was buried at Oak Hill Cemetery, despite the fact that he had left instructions for his body to be cremated. In 1944, his remains were moved to the House of the Temple, headquarters of the Southern Jurisdiction of the Scottish Rite.  The House of the Temple contains numerous memorials and artifacts related to Pike, including his personal library.

A memorial to Pike was erected in 1901 in the Judiciary Square neighborhood of Washington, D.C. The location was appropriate considering that Pike had sued the government to secure Native American rights. The statue portrayed him as a private citizen and Freemason. He was the only former Confederate military officer with an outdoor statue in Washington, D.C., and in 2019 Delegate Eleanor Holmes Norton called for its removal. On June 19, 2020, protestors tore down the statue and set it ablaze, in connection with the George Floyd protests because of Pike's association with the Confederacy and of his alleged association with the Ku Klux Klan.

The Albert Pike Memorial Temple is an historic Masonic lodge in Little Rock, Arkansas; the structure is listed on the National Register of Historic Places.

Controversies
In the aftermath of the Civil War, as former Confederates found themselves barred from the ballot box, Pike remained deeply opposed to black suffrage, insisting that "the white race, and that race alone, shall govern this country. It is the only one that is fit to govern, and it is the only one that shall."

Regarding membership in the Freemasons, Pike is quoted as saying, "Prince Hall Lodge was as regular a Lodge as any Lodge created by competent authority. It had a perfect right to establish other Lodges and make itself a Mother Lodge. I am not inclined to meddle in the matter. I took my obligations from white men, not from negroes. When I have to accept negroes as brothers or leave masonry, I shall leave it. Better let the thing drift."

In a 1945 letter however, Willard W. Allen, the Sovereign Grand Commander of the United Supreme Council, S.J. Prince Hall Affiliation (African-American Freemasons), noted, "what practically all Masonic scholars know very well, viz., that in the closing years of General Pike's Masonic career, he became a very staunch friend of Negro Masonry." Pike had become a personal friend of Thornton A. Jackson, Supreme Grand Commander of the United Supreme Council, Southern Jurisdiction, Prince Hall Affiliation and even gifted to Thornton his complete set of rituals for Prince Hall Scottish Rite Masonry to use.

Pike's only known writing on the Klan, an 1868 editorial in the Memphis Daily Appeal, indicates that his main problems lay not with its aims, but with its methods and leadership. Later in this editorial, he proposed "one great Order of Southern Brotherhood," a secret society which would have been a larger and more centrally organized version of the Klan: "If it were in our power, if it could be effected, we would unite every white man in the South, who is opposed to negro suffrage, into one great Order of Southern Brotherhood, with an organization complete, active, vigorous, in which a few should execute the concentrated will of all, and whose very existence should be concealed from all but its members."

Histories of the Ku Klux Klan published in the early 20th century identify Pike as a high-ranking official of the order. Walter Lynwood Fleming, in 1905's Ku Klux Klan: Its Origin, Growth and Disbandment, lists Pike as the Klan's "chief judicial officer". Susan Lawrence Davis, whose father was a founding member of the Klan in Alabama, writes in her sympathetic account titled Authentic History: Ku Klux Klan, 1865-1877, published in 1924, that Pike was personally chosen by Nathan Bedford Forrest to serve as the Klan's "Chief Judicial Officer" and to head the Klan in Arkansas as "Grand Dragon of that Realm." In 1939's Invisible Empire: The Story of the Ku Klux Klan, 1866-1871, Stanley Horn also reports that Forrest appointed Pike and credits him with a surge of local Klan activity in April 1868. Horn says that a pro-Klan poem, Death's Brigade, is attributed to Pike. Southern Agrarian poet John Gould Fletcher, who grew up in Little Rock in a house that Pike built, also believed Pike was the poem's author.

It was not until 1971, that Allen W. Trelease published White Terror: The Ku Klux Klan Conspiracy and Southern Reconstruction, and cast doubt on Pike's KKK membership as, according to Trelease, the offices that Pike allegedly held are not mentioned in "The Prescript", the Klan constitution. However, the office of Grand Dragon, which Davis claims Pike once held, is mentioned in the 1867 Klan constitution.

No contemporary evidence shows that Pike was ever affiliated with the Klan. When the US Congress investigated the KKK in 1871, its report failed to support these allegations, and Pike's name was not found in any Klan records, or to be associated with it.

Walter Lee Brown in his 1997 biography of Pike, likewise asserts that that Pike was not a member of the Klan. Walter Lee Brown claims the work of Davis, Fleming, and Brown are "unreliable histories", but offers no further evidence other than citing Trelease.

Selected works
 Indo-Aryan Deities and Worship as Contained in the Rig-Veda (1872)
 Morals and Dogma of the Ancient and Accepted Scottish Rite (1872)
 Book of the Words (1874)
 Reprints of Old Rituals (1879)
 Esoterika (1887)

See also
 List of Arkansas adjutants general
 List of Confederate States Army generals
 List of Freemasons
 List of people from Boston
 List of people from Little Rock, Arkansas

Footnotes

References

Further reading

External links

 
 Albert Pike at Freemasonry.network
 Albert Pike and Lucifer at Freemasonry and the World (albertpike.wordpress.com)
 Albert Pike and Masonic Lodge Symbols at Allfreemasonry.com
 Albert Pike's Philosophy at Masonicinfo.com
 "Everybody's Dixie" by Albert Pike at Civilwarpoetry.org
 
 
 

1809 births
1891 deaths
19th-century American educators
19th-century American Episcopalians
19th-century American judges
19th-century American lawyers
19th-century American male writers
19th-century American newspaper editors
19th-century American non-fiction writers
19th-century occultists
19th-century United States Army personnel
Activists from Arkansas
Adjutants General of Arkansas
American duellists
American Freemasons
American lawyers admitted to the practice of law by reading law
American military personnel of the Mexican–American War
American militia officers
American people of English descent
American political journalists
American slave owners
Arkansas Democrats
Arkansas Know Nothings
Arkansas lawyers
Arkansas Whigs
Burials at Oak Hill Cemetery (Washington, D.C.)
Confederate States Army brigadier generals
Confederate States of America diplomats
Deaths from digestive disease
Editors of Arkansas newspapers
Episcopalians from Massachusetts
Exiled politicians
Justices of the Arkansas Supreme Court
Lawyers from Little Rock, Arkansas
Lawyers from Washington, D.C.
Northern-born Confederates
People of Arkansas in the American Civil War
Recipients of American presidential pardons
Schoolteachers from Massachusetts
Writers from Arkansas